Mount Robert Barron is a  elevation mountain summit located on Admiralty Island in the Alexander Archipelago, in the U.S. state of Alaska. Although modest in elevation, relief is significant since the peak rises up from tidewater at Funter Bay on Lynn Canal in less than two miles, and from Stephens Passage to the east in less than three miles.

History

This geographic feature was named by the U.S. Coast and Geodetic Survey in 1919 for Robert James Barron (1896–1917), son of James T. Barron, both of whom were instrumental in developing the Funter Bay region. Robert enlisted with the Aviation Service on June 2, 1917; and, on August 22, 1917, sacrificed his life in an effort to rescue two imperiled fellow pilots when he drowned in the Delaware River as the airplane he was flying fell into the water. The War Department honored his heroism by naming Barron Field in Texas after him. The mountain's name was officially adopted in 1919 by the U.S. Board on Geographic Names.

Climate

Based on the Köppen climate classification, Mount Robert Barron has a subarctic climate with cold, snowy winters, and mild summers. Weather systems coming off the Gulf of Alaska are forced upwards by the mountains (orographic lift), causing heavy precipitation in the form of rainfall and snowfall. Temperatures can drop below −20 °C with wind chill factors below −30 °C. The month of July offers the most favorable weather for viewing or climbing Mount Robert Barron.

See also

List of mountain peaks of Alaska
Geography of Alaska

References

External links
 Weather forecast: Mount Robert Barron
 Biography of Robert Barron
 Flying Around Mt. Robert Barron: YouTube

Robert Barron
Robert Barron